Xi'an West railway station is a railway station in Wangsi Subdistrict, Chang'an District, Xi'an, Shaanxi, China. It is an intermediate stop on the Xi'an–Chengdu high-speed railway.

The station opened as Epanggong railway station on 6 December 2017. On 28 February 2023, it was renamed Xi'an West.

References 

Railway stations in Shaanxi
Railway stations in China opened in 2017